Panolopus is a genus of diploglossid lizards endemic to the island of Hispaniola in the Caribbean, in both the Dominican Republic and Haiti.

Taxonomy
There are three species in this genus, all of which were formerly classified in the genus Celestus until the genus Panolopus was revived for them in 2021.

Species 

 Panolopus costatus  – Hispaniolan smooth galliwasp or common Hispaniolan galliwasp
 Panolopus curtissi  – Curtiss' galliwasp or Hispaniolan khaki galliwasp
 Panolopus marcanoi  – Marcano's galliwasp or Pico Duarte galliwasp

References 
Panolopus
Lizard genera

Taxa named by Edward Drinker Cope
Lizards of the Caribbean